The Bluebell Hill transmitting station is a broadcasting and telecommunications facility located at Blue Bell Hill between Maidstone and Rochester in the English county of Kent.

The station is situated on the crest of the North Downs and comprises five steel lattice towers, each 45 to 50 metres tall - their height being compromised by the location of nearby Rochester Airport. It broadcasts digital television, FM and DAB radio to much of north, west, and central Kent, and an overspill service into southern Essex. It stopped broadcasting analogue television when the digital switchover was completed on 27 June 2012. When in analogue service, the broadcast power of 30 kW for a main transmitter was unique in the United Kingdom, the strength being limited by potential interference with transmitters in France and the Low Countries.

Services broadcast include BBC One (South East), BBC Two, ITV (Meridian), Channel 4, Heart Kent, KMFM Medway and KMFM Maidstone. Between its opening in 1974 and 31 December 1981 the transmitter broadcast Thames Television (weekdays) and London Weekend Television (weekends), being switched on 1 January 1982 to carry signals from the new ITV franchise TVS (Television South), until superseded on 1 January 1993 by ITV Meridian for ITV in the south east. The transmitter takes its main BBC1 feed from Crystal Palace, with an opt-out for BBC local news in the South East broadcast from studios in Tunbridge Wells. Although timing is of the essence at this point the human factor sometimes results in a delay of a second or two, enabling viewers to glimpse the London studio and presenter before the Tunbridge Wells studio appears.

Bluebell Hill was originally an E group for analogue, then became a B group at DSO. At its 700 MHz clearance in July 2018 it became a K group (excluding the temporary MUXES 7 and 8). Most E groups and B groups, as well as widebands and K groups, will work OK on Bluebell Hill (see graph).

Services available

Analogue radio

Digital radio

Digital television

Before switchover

Analogue television
Analogue television transmissions have now ceased. BBC2 was closed on 13 June 2012 and the remaining three services on 27 June. Channel 5 was never broadcast from this transmitter.

References

External links 
The Transmission Gallery: Bluebell Hill
Info and pictures of Bluebell Hill transmitter including historical power/frequency changes and co-receivable transmitters

Tonbridge and Malling
Transmitter sites in England